Michael Tommy may refer to:

 Michael Tommy (footballer) (born 1979), Sierra Leonean international football goalkeeper
 Michael Tommy (alpine skier) (born 1963), Canadian former alpine skier